UFC 63: Hughes vs. Penn 2 was a mixed martial arts (MMA) event held by the Ultimate Fighting Championship on September 23, 2006. The event took place at the Arrowhead Pond in Anaheim, California and was broadcast live on pay-per-view (PPV) in the United States and Canada.

Background

The event, originally subtitled "Hughes vs. St-Pierre," was scheduled to feature a UFC Welterweight Title match between champion Matt Hughes and Georges St-Pierre. Nevertheless, a groin injury—which was reported early in August, forced St-Pierre off the card. At first, St-Pierre sought a physiotherapist, hoping the injury would heal on its own during training; however, it was later announced that St-Pierre would indeed withdraw from his long-awaited title shot. Taking his place was former UFC Welterweight Champion, B.J. Penn, who defeated Hughes in a championship fight in 2004, and was beaten by St-Pierre at UFC 58. In fact, the Penn loss was Hughes' only defeat in his last twenty fights.

The Quad-City Times reported that Pat Miletich expressed outrage that the UFC had apparently scheduled this event alongside a bout he had forthcoming in the IFL, which caused him to miss cornering Hughes and Pulver, fighters whom he coaches, in their UFC matches.

Results

Bonus awards
Fight of the Night: Matt Hughes vs. B.J. Penn and Roger Huerta vs. Jason Dent
Knockout of the Night: Joe Lauzon
Submission of the Night: Tyson Griffin

Georges St-Pierre comments on Matt Hughes performance
At the post-fight interview, after Penn left the cage, St-Pierre stepped into the ring to hype up his upcoming title bout against Hughes, stating that he was glad that Hughes won his fight, but that he was "not impressed by [Hughes'] performance".

According to both commentator Joe Rogan and Hughes' own autobiography, Hughes was unhappy with St-Pierre's statement. Hughes said that they "had words" off-camera shortly after, at which time St-Pierre apologized, saying he had misunderstood something Hughes had said on the microphone and did not mean to offend him.

See also
 Ultimate Fighting Championship
 List of UFC champions
 List of UFC events
 2006 in UFC

References

External links
UFC 63 Results on Sherdog.com
Official UFC Website
Official UFC 63 PPV Site
UFC 63 Fighter Salary Breakdown

Ultimate Fighting Championship events
Events in Anaheim, California
2006 in mixed martial arts
Mixed martial arts in Anaheim, California
Sports competitions in Anaheim, California
2006 in sports in California